The Morgantown Metropolitan Statistical Area, as defined by the United States Census Bureau, is an area consisting of two counties in North-Central West Virginia, anchored by the city of Morgantown. As of the 2020 census, the MSA had a population of 140,038. The MSA is part of the larger Morgantown–Fairmont Combined Statistical Area.

Counties

Communities

Incorporated places and CDPs
Places with more than 30,000 inhabitants
Morgantown (Principal city)

Places with 5,000 to 10,000 inhabitants
Cheat Lake (census-designated place)
Brookhaven (census-designated place)
Places with 1,000 to 5,000 inhabitants
Cassville (census-designated place)
Granville
Kingwood
Terra Alta
Star City
Westover
Places with 500 to 1,000 inhabitants
Masontown
Reedsville
Rowlesburg
Places with fewer than 500 inhabitants
Albright
Blacksville
Brandonville
Bruceton Mills
Newburg
Tunnelton

Unincorporated places

Afton
Alpine Lake
Amboy
Arnettsville
Arthurdale
Aurora
Austen
Baker Ridge
Behler
Bertha Hill
Booth
Borgman
Bowlby
Bretz
Brewer Hill
Browns Chapel
Bula
Canyon
Cascade
Cheat Neck
Chestnut Ridge
Clifton Mills
Clinton Furnace
Core
Corinth
Crossroads
Crown
Cuzzart
Daybrook
Dellslow
Delmar
Denver
Easton
Edna
Eglon
Evansville
Everettville

Fellowsville
Fieldcrest
Flaggy Meadow
Fort Grand
Fort Martin
Georgetown
Gladefarms
Greer
Greystone
Gum Spring
Hagans
Halleck
Harmony Grove
Hazelton
Hilderbrand
Hoard
Hog Eye
Holman
Hopemont
Hopewell
Horse Shoe Run
Howesville
Hunting Hills
Independence
Jaco
Jakes Run
Jere
Kimberly
Klondike
Laurel Point
Little Falls
Little Sandy
Lowsville
Macdale
Maidsville

Manheim
Manown
Maple
Marquess
McCurdyville
McMellin
Miracle Run
Mooresville
Morgan Heights
Mount Olivet
Mount Vernon
National
New Hill
Opekiska
Orr
Osage
Osgood
Pedlar
Pentress
Pierpont
Pioneer Rocks
Pisgah
Pleasantdale
Preston
Price Hill
Price
Pursglove
Ragtown
Randall
Richard
Ridgedale
Ringgold
Rock Forge
Rockville
Rodemer

Rohr
Rosedale
Ruthbelle
Sabraton
Saint Cloud
Saint Joe
Saint Leo
Sandy
Scotch Hill
Sell
Silver Lake
Sinclair
Smithtown
Snider
Stevensburg
Stewartstown
Sturgisson
Sugar Valley
Suncrest Lake
Sunset Beach
The Mileground
Threefork Bridge
Triune
Turner Douglass
Tyrone
Uffington
Valley Point
Van Voorhis
Victoria
Wadestown
Wana
West End
West Sabraton
West Van Voorhis
White Oak Springs
Worley
Zevely

Demographics

As of the census of 2000, there were 111,200 people, 44,990 households, and 26,852 families residing within the MSA. The racial makeup of the MSA was 93.97% White, 2.56% African American, 0.17% Native American, 1.85% Asian, 0.04% Pacific Islander, 0.25% from other races, and 1.16% from two or more races. Hispanic or Latino of any race were 0.89% of the population.

The median income for a household in the MSA was $28,276, and the median income for a family was $38,266. Males had a median income of $29,777 versus $20,867 for females. The per capita income for the MSA was $15,351.

Combined Statistical Area
The Morgantown MSA is combined with the Fairmont μSA to form the Morgantown-Fairmont Combined Statistical Area (CSA), which had a population of 186,127 at the 2010 census.  In addition to the two counties of the Morgantown MSA, the CSA comprises the city of Fairmont (2020 population 18,313) and the rest of Marion County, which lies to the west of the counties of the Morgantown MSA.

See also
West Virginia census statistical areas

References

 
Monongalia County, West Virginia
Preston County, West Virginia
Metropolitan areas of West Virginia